The Bharat Scouts and Guides (BSG) is the national Scouting and Guiding association of India. The national headquarters of BSG is recognised by the Government of India.

Scouting was founded in India in 1909 as an overseas branch of the Scout Association and became a member of the World Organization of the Scout Movement in 1938. Guiding in India started in 1911 and was amongst the founder members of the World Association of Girl Guides and Girl Scouts in 1928, also covering present-day Bangladesh and Pakistan at that time. The BSG serves 2,886,460 Scouts (as of 2011) and 1,286,161 Guides (as of 2005).

History

Boy Scouts

Scouting was officially founded in British India in 1909, first starting at the Bishop Cotton Boys' School in Bangalore. Scouting for native Indians was started by Justice Vivian Bose, Madan Mohan, Hridayanath Kunzru, Girija Shankar Bajpai, Annie Besant and George Arundale, in 1913. Prior to this date, Scouting was open only for British and foreign Scouts. In 1916, a Cub section was started, followed by the Rover section in 1918.

In 1916, Calcutta's Senior Deputy Commissioner of Police J. S. Wilson introduced Scouting for Boys as a textbook in the Calcutta Police Training School. Colonel Wilson volunteered his services to the District Scout Commissioner, Alfred Pickford, and in 1917 became Assistant Scoutmaster of the Old Mission Church Troop. Together the two struggled for the admission of Indian boys into the Boy Scouts Association, which had not been admitted due to a Government of India order against it because "Scouting might train them to become revolutionaries". Shortly Wilson was acting as Cubmaster and Scoutmaster, and succeeded Pickford as District Commissioner in May 1919 when Pickford was promoted to Chief Scout Commissioner for India.

As a way of getting around the Government Order, the Boy Scouts of Bengal was founded, with identical aims and methods. Many separate Scout organizations began to spring up, the Indian Boy Scouts Association, founded in 1916, based in Madras and headed by Annie Besant and George Arundale; Boy Scouts of Mysore; Boy Scouts of Baroda; Nizam's Scouts in Hyderabad; Seva Samiti Scout Association (Humanity Uplift Service Society), founded in 1917 by Madan Mohan Malaviya and Hridayanath Kunzru and based in Allahabad; the aforementioned Boy Scouts of Bengal and likely others. A conference was held in Calcutta in August 1920 in which Wilson staged a Scout Rally, and as a result the Viceroy of India sent an invitation to Lord Baden-Powell, by then Chief Scout of the World, to visit India. Lord and Lady Baden-Powell arrived in Bombay in late January 1921 for a short tour of the subcontinent before leaving Calcutta for Rangoon. Alfred Pickford accompanied them and became one of their closest friends.

The result of this visit was a union of all of the Scout organizations except the Seva Samiti Scout Association into The Boy Scouts Association in India. In 1922 Pickford returned to England and was appointed Overseas Commissioner of The Boy Scouts Association at their headquarters in London, but his aim of adding Indian boys into the program had been fulfilled.

In 1938, a number of members left the Boy Scouts Association in India after a wave of nationalism. They formed – together with the Seva Samiti Scout Association and the newly founded India National Scout Association – the Hindustan Scout Association, the first coeducational Scouting and Guiding organisation in India. In the same year, the Boy Scouts Association in India became a member of the World Organization of the Scout Movement.

Girl Guides
The first Girl Guides company was founded in Jabalpur in 1911 at Christ Church School The movement immediately grew: In 1915, more than fifty companies existed with a membership of over 1,200, all of them directly registered with the Girl Guide Association and all restricted to girls of European descent. These companies formed the All India Girl Guides Association in 1916. In the same year the organisation opened for Indian girls.

J. S. Wilson provided transportation for Girl Guide rallies.
The girls themselves were never quite sure whether they preferred to ride in police vans or in the riot truck. The former concealed them from public view, but were very hot; the latter, being cages of expanded metal, were cooler, but reminiscent of the Calcutta Zoo!
In 1928, the All India Girl Guides Association joined the World Association of Girl Guides and Girl Scouts as one of its founder members. This membership was renewed in 1948 after the independence of India and its partition.

Bharat Scouts and Guides

In the first years after India's independence leading politicians, including Jawaharlal Nehru, Maulana Abul Kalam Azad and Mangal Das Pakvasa, as well as Scout leaders tried to unify India's Scouts and Guides. A first success was the merger of the Boy Scouts Association in India and the Hindustan Scout Association forming the Bharat Scouts and Guides on 7 November 1950. About a year later, on 15 August 1951, the All India Girl Guides Association joined this new organisation.

In 1959, the 17th World Scout Conference in New Delhi was hosted by the BSG. The Sangam World Girl Guide/Girl Scout Center in Pune, Maharashtra, India, opened in 1966. The idea for this fourth World Centre dates back to 1956 when it was developed during a WAGGGS International commissioners' meeting in New Delhi.

The United Nations selected the Bharat Scouts and Guides as honorary "Peace Messengers" for their significant and concrete contributions to the International Year of Peace in 1986.

Sethna's 18th West Bombay Scout Group
Sethna's 18th West Bombay Scout Group is the oldest continuously running Scout Group in India. It was established in 1914, when Rustomji Edulji Sethna (1898–1954) came across the book Scouting for Boys, written by Robert Baden-Powell, the founder of the Scout movement. He was enamoured by the book and formed one of India's first Scout groups for native boys. Prior to that, there existed some Scout groups, but they were primarily for the British expatriates in India.

Sethna resisted joining one of the competing Scout associations and registering his troop until Scouting became open for all irrespective of color, caste, or creed. He wrote to Baden-Powell about this discrepancy. In 1921 the regulations were changed and all were allowed to become part of the Scout movement in India. The 18th West has been continuously running since the day it started. None of the World Wars or the Partition of India stopped the group from functioning.

Sea Scouts and Guides
Sea Scouts and Guides is the oldest continuously running Sea Scout Group in India. It was re-established in 2000 by Ocean Cadet Academy Nigdi/Pune, Maharashtra and got affiliation with The Bharat Scouts and Guides, National Headquarters, New Delhi on 18/1/2022 as Auxiliary Unit. url=http://www.seascoutsindia.com/

Henry Warington Smyth Baden-Powell KC (3 February 1847 – 24 April 1921), known as Warrington, was a British admiralty lawyer, master mariner and canoeist. Robert, asked him to write a manual for Sea Scouts. He wrote a book on Sea Scouting and held positions in The Boy Scouts Association, formed by his brother, Robert Baden-Powell.

In June 1912, his book, Sea Scouting and Seamanship for Boys was published.

In 2011, a Sea Scout Group of the Portuguese Corpo Nacional de Escutas based in The Azores, named their 16-metre sailing yacht Almirante Warrington Baden-Powell in his honour. In 2012, a bronze bust of Warington was unveiled by Edward Baden-Powell, the great grandson of Sir George Baden-Powell, at The Scout Association's national headquarters at Gilwell Park in Essex.

Notable members
Vivian Bose was a member of the World Scout Committee of the World Organization of the Scout Movement from 1947 until 1949.

In 1969, Mrs. Lakshmi Mazumdar was awarded the Bronze Wolf, the only distinction of the World Organization of the Scout Movement, awarded by the World Scout Committee for exceptional services to world Scouting.

Program
The association describes its aims in its mission:
The mission of Scouting is to contribute to the education of young people, through a value system based on the Scout Promise and Law to help build a better world where people are self-fulfilled as individuals and play a constructive role in society.

Scout and Guide units are separate although they have some coeducational activities such as Jamborees, rallies, and conferences. Differently-abled boys and girls also participate in the Scouting program.

The Scout emblem incorporates a wheel with twenty-four spokes, known as the Ashoka Chakra, taken from the Ashoka pillar at Sarnath, in the green-and-saffron colors of the flag of India.

Sections and branches

The association is divided in four (respective three) sections according to age:

Bunnies (Both Boys and Girls) - ages 3 to 5
Bharat Scouts
 Cubs - boys, ages 5 to 10
 Scouts - boys, ages 10 to 17
 Rovers - boys, ages 17 to 25

Bharat Guides
 Bulbuls - girls, ages 5 to 10
 Guides - girls, ages 10 to 17
 Rangers - girls, ages 17 to 25

Additionally, there are four special branches:
 Extension Scouting
 Sea Scouting
 Air Scouting
 Venture Club Scheme

Awards
The highest awards are
 for the Cubs/Bulbuls section the "Golden Arrow Award"
 for the Scout/Guide section the Rashtrapati Scout/Guide Award
 for the Rover/Ranger section the Rashtrapati Rover/Ranger Award

Scout/Guide Motto
 Bunnies - Keep smiling
 Cubs/Bulbuls - Do your best
 Scouts/Guides - Be Prepared
 Rovers/Rangers - Service

Scout/Guide Promise
"On my honor I promise that I will do my best
To do my duty to God and my country
To help other people and
To obey the Scout/Guide Law."

Scout and Guide Law
 A Scout/Guide is trustworthy
 A Scout/Guide is loyal
 A Scout/Guide is a friend to all and a brother/sister to every other Scout/Guide.
 A Scout/Guide is courteous
 A Scout/Guide is a friend to animals and loves nature.
 A Scout/Guide is disciplined and helps to protect public property.
 A Scout/Guide is courageous.
 A Scout/Guide is thrifty.
 A Scout/Guide is pure in thought, word and deed.

Membership

Leadership

Presidents
 Mangal Das Pakvasa 1953 to November 1960
 Ammu Swaminathan November 1960 to March 1965
 Justice Bhuvaneshwar Prasad Sinha April 1965 to February 1967
 Sir Chandulal M. Trivedi February 1967 to October 1973
 Dharma Vira November 1973 to September 1976
 Jagjivan Ram September 1976 to April 1983
 Shankarrao Chavan April 1983 to November 1998
 Rameshwar Thakur November 1998 to November 2001
 Sharad Pawar November 2001 to November 2004
 Rameshwar Thakur November 2004 to November 2013
 Ashok Gehlot November 2013 to November 2016
 Dr. Anil Jain November 2016 to present

Chief National Commissioners
 Dr. Hridya Nath Kunzru 1952 to November 1957
 Justice Vivian Bose November 1957 to November 1959
 Professor Madan Mohan November 1959 to November 1960
 Dr. Hridya Nath Kunzru November 1960 to November 1964
 Mrs. Lakhshmi Mazumdar November 1964 to April 1983
 Lakshman Singh April 1983 to November 1992
 V.P. Deenadayalu Naidu November 1992 to November 1995
 Lalit Mohan Jain November 1995 to November 2013
 Bhaidas I. Nagarale November 2013 to 25 May 2017
 Dr. Krishana Kumar Khandelwal 9 July 2017 to present
Title of National Commissioner changed to Chief National Commissioner on 30 November 2014

Overseas units
The BSG maintains units for Indian citizens in Saudi Arabia, Qatar, Oman, United Arab Emirates, and Yemen.

See also
 Lakshmi Mazumdar
 Evelyn Norah Shullai
 Satish Ranjan Das
 Sangam World Girl Guide/Girl Scout Center

Notes

References

Literature
 Scouting 'Round the World, John S. Wilson, first edition, Blandford Press 1959 page 203.

External links
 
 Sethnas 18th West Bombay Scout Group India's oldest continuously running Scout troop

World Association of Girl Guides and Girl Scouts member organizations
World Organization of the Scout Movement member organizations
Scouting and Guiding in India
Youth organizations established in 1950
Organisations based in Delhi
1950 establishments in India
Child-related organisations in India
1909 establishments in India
Youth organizations established in 1909